Cameron Abbott (born October 24, 1983) is a Canadian former professional ice hockey player, who predominantly played with Luleå HF of the Swedish Hockey League (SHL) and now serves as the head coach for Rögle BK of the SHL.

Playing career
Born in Sarnia, Ontario, Abbott played collegiate hockey for Cornell University of the ECAC from 2002 until 2006. He turned professional in 2006 with the Bossier-Shreveport Mudbugs of the Central Hockey League. In the 2007–08 season he moved to Europe to play for the IF Frisk Asker Tigers of the GET-ligaen. In 2008, he signed with the Rögle BK of the Swedish Elitserien. After a great season in RBK, Cameron, together with his brother Chris, signed a two-year contract with Luleå HF.

Cameron has played with his twin brother Chris on several teams. After his fifth season with Luleå HF, with Chris having left the club for HV71, Abbott opted to retire from professional hockey on August 2, 2015.

References

External links

1983 births
Bossier-Shreveport Mudbugs players
Canadian expatriate ice hockey players in Norway
Canadian expatriate ice hockey players in Sweden
Canadian ice hockey left wingers
Cornell Big Red men's ice hockey players
Frisk Asker Ishockey players
Ice hockey people from Ontario
Living people
Long Beach Ice Dogs (ECHL) players
Luleå HF players
Rögle BK players
Sportspeople from Sarnia
Stockton Thunder players
Canadian twins
Twin sportspeople
Rögle BK coaches
Swedish Hockey League coaches